William Estes (born October 21, 1978) is an American actor known for his role on CBS police drama Blue Bloods as Jameson "Jamie" Reagan, a New York City Police Department officer and the youngest son of the police commissioner, played by Tom Selleck. Prior to that role, he starred as J.J. Pryor, on the NBC drama American Dreams.

Early life

Estes was born and raised in Los Angeles, California, where he currently resides.

Career

Estes' break-out movie role was Seaman Ronald 'Rabbit' Parker on U-571.  Early in his career, he did many commercials including Fruit of the Loom and numerous guest starring roles in series like Highway to Heaven and Santa Barbara.

Estes landed his first major role in a television series when he was chosen out of 700 other children to play Will McCollough (essentially the "Timmy" role) in the syndicated New Lassie series, which ran from 1989 to 1992. Since then, he has had many starring roles in television series and he dabbled in the music video industry. He has appeared in Meat Loaf's video "Objects in the Rear View Mirror May Appear Closer than They Are" (from Bat Out of Hell II: Back into Hell) and was in Bon Jovi's video "It's My Life" with Shiri Appleby.

In 2000, according to a 2005 Soap Talk interview, Estes was asked by Jon Bon Jovi to be in his music video after he worked with Estes on U-571. Estes did most of his own stunts in the video.

Estes had a leading role in the Fox series Reunion. The series followed six best friends over the course of 20 years, with each episode marking the next successive year. When the group meets up for its 20th high school reunion, one turns up dead at the end of the night. In late 2005, Fox announced that the series would be canceled because of low ratings and the identity of the murderer would not be revealed.

Estes portrayed Jack Kerouac in the 2007 short film Luz Del Mundo, written by Ty Roberts and David Trimble, directed by Ty Roberts, and produced by Ryan McWhirter and John Pitts. He has also appeared in a couple of photographs, in the books Hollywood Splash and Men Before 10 AM Too. He was nominated four times for one award, the Young Artist Awards for The New Lassie and Kirk.

Since 2010, Estes has been playing Jamie Reagan in the police procedural television series Blue Bloods.

Personal life 
Estes has been briefly romantically linked to actresses Jennifer Love Hewitt in 2004 and Torrey DeVitto in 2020.

Filmography

Films

Television

Awards and nominations

References

External links
 
 

1978 births
American male child actors
American male television actors
Living people
Male actors from Los Angeles
20th-century American male actors
21st-century American male actors